Haskell County is the name of several counties in the United States:

 Haskell County, Kansas 
 Haskell County, Oklahoma 
 Haskell County, Texas